FV106 Samson is a British Army armoured recovery vehicle, one of the CVR(T) family. The main role of this vehicle is to recover the CVR(T) family of vehicles, but can recover other light tracked vehicles such as the FV430 series.

Design and features
The Samson was conceived in the early 1970s with the final design entering production in 1978. The hull is an all-welded aluminium construction. It usually carries a crew of three operating a 3.5T capstan winch that can also be utilised in a lifting configuration. It carries suitable equipment to enable a 4:1 mechanical advantage with 228m of winch rope. This winch is capable of recovering up to 12 Tonnes of vehicle. A manually operated earth anchor is situated at the rear to anchor the vehicle while operations are carried out.

The Samson can be fitted with a flotation screen so it can be operated amphibiously using its own tracks at 6.5 km/h or at 9.6 km/h if also fitted with a propeller kit. The Samson can also be fitted with a full NBC protection unit.

Operators

A single Samson accompanied the two troops of Blues and Royals CVR(T)s to the Falklands War.

Current operators
  One in service
 
  – 2 vehicles in service
 
  – 3 vehicles in service
  – 6 vehicles in service
 
  – In service with the British Army and Royal Air Force
  - 5 vehicles from the United Kingdom in 2022

Examples on display
The REME Museum has an example of a Samson on display in The Prince Philip Vehicle Hall.

See also
Armoured recovery vehicles
CVR(T)
REME

References

Foss, C and Gander, T, "Jane's Military Logistics" (1988) 9th edition

Tracked armoured recovery vehicles
Cold War armoured fighting vehicles of the United Kingdom
Military vehicles introduced in the 1970s